Kyle McAusland (born 19 January 1993) is a Scottish footballer who plays as a defender for  club Cumnock Juniors.

McAusland has previously played for Rangers, Dunfermline Athletic, whilst also having spent time on loan with Ayr United, Brechin City and Glenafton Athletic.

Career
McAusland, from Cumnock, East Ayrshire, joined Rangers aged thirteen in 2006. At that time he played as a striker and during his spell in the youth teams played in a variety of positions before settling as a right back.

McAusland was loaned to Ayr United for the first part of the 2012–13 season and signed a new contract with Rangers in February 2013, through to the summer of 2015. A few months later he made his competitive Rangers debut in a Challenge Cup at right back on 27 July against Albion Rovers. McAusland went on to make a further six appearances for Rangers (five of which were starts) before losing his place in the side after the signing of the experienced Richard Foster. In October 2013, McAusland re-joined Ayr United for the rest of the 2013–14 season after requesting more first-team football.

After failing to feature in manager Ally McCoists plans at the start of the season, McAusland was loaned out to Brechin City in September 2014. In January 2015, after return from his loan spell, McAusland had his contract terminated with Rangers in order for him to join Dunfermline Athletic.

On 22 June 2015 Alloa Athletic announced the signing of McAusland.

McAusland joined Junior side Glenafton Athletic in July 2016.

McAusland signed with Cumnock Juniors in June 2020.

Career statistics

References

External links

1993 births
Living people
Footballers from Irvine, North Ayrshire
People from Cumnock
Scottish footballers
Footballers from East Ayrshire
Association football defenders
Rangers F.C. players
Ayr United F.C. players
Brechin City F.C. players
Scottish Football League players
Scottish Professional Football League players
Dunfermline Athletic F.C. players
Alloa Athletic F.C. players
Scottish Junior Football Association players
Glenafton Athletic F.C. players
Cumnock Juniors F.C. players
West of Scotland Football League players